Aisin Gioro Yunbi (允秘; 5 July 1716 – 3 December 1773), born Yinbi , formally known by his title as Prince Xian (𫍯王) , was an imperial prince of the Qing Dynasty and the 24th surviving son of the Kangxi Emperor.

Life 
Yinbi was born on 5 July 1716 to Concubine Mu, Lady Chen (陳氏), a Han Chinese native. Lady Chen died in 1727 and was buried  in Jingling tombs. Yinbi was forced to change the first character of his name to "yun".

In the 11th year of Yongzheng, Yunbi was granted the title of Prince Xian of the First Rank by Yongzheng Emperor because of his loyal and studious nature. 朕幼弟允祕，秉心忠厚，賦性和平，素為皇考所鍾愛。數年以來，在宮中讀書，學識亦漸增長，朕心嘉悅，封為諴親王

Our youngest brother Yunbi, cordial and loyal, harmoneous, therefore favoured by the Predcessor. After several years of studying books in palace he presented dilligence. We are rejoiced, therefore grant him a title of Prince Xian of the First Rank.Yunbi successively held official position during Yongzheng era. During his lifetime, Yinbi served as first rank military official (都統) of the Bordered White Banner, Plain White Banner and Plain Yellow Banner.

He died on 3 December 1773 and posthumously named Prince Xianke of the First Rank (諴恪親王).

Family 
Primary Consort

 Primary Consort, of the Uya clan (嫡福晉 烏雅氏)
 First Daughter (24 September 1734 — 13 March 1736)
 Princess of the Third Rank (4 November 1735 – 31 January 1753), second daughter
 Married Mazhate Dorji (马札特多尔济) of the Aohan clan (敖漢) in 1750
 Third Daughter (25 June 1737 — 30 May 1745)
 Hongchang (諴密郡王 弘暢; 6 January 1741 – 18 February  1795), Prince Xianmi of the Second Rank, first son
 Fifth Daughter (2 March 1742 – 5 March 1743)
 Princess of the Third Rank (郡主; b. 3 May 1743), sixth daughter
 Married Tetongte'e (特通特额) of the Magiya clan in 1760
 Princess of the Third Rank (郡主; b. 23 October 1745), seventh daughter
 Married Naxuntegusi (纳逊特古斯) in 1759

Secondary Consort

 Secondary Consort, of the Niohuru clan (側福晉 鈕祜祿氏)
 Lady of the First Rank (郡君; b. 14 April 1738), fourth daughter 
 Married Banjur (班珠尔) of the Borjigin in 1756
 Hongkang (不入八分輔國公 弘康; 12 September 1747 – 23 May 1814), Duke of the Fourth Rank, third son
 Secondary Consort, of the Yin clan (側福晉 殷氏)
 Hongwu (奉恩將軍 弘旿; 15 November 1743 – 28 June 1811), General of the Fourth Rank, second son

Concubine

 Mistress, of the Chen clan (庶福晉 陳氏)
 Hongchao (輔國將軍 弘超; 3 November 1755 – 19 July 1808), General of the Second Rank, fourth son
 Mistress, of the  Wang clan (妾 王氏)

Ancestry

References 

 清皇室四谱
 

Qing dynasty imperial princes
Prince Shen
Kangxi Emperor's sons
1716 births
1773 deaths